Luigi Rizzo, 1st Count of Grado and Premuda (1887–1951), nicknamed the Sinker, was an Italian admiral. He is mostly known for his distinguished service in World War I; as a torpedo boat commander having sunk no fewer than two Austro-Hungarian battleships (SMS Wien in 1917 and SMS Szent István in 1918).

Biography

Born in Milazzo, Sicily  on October 8, 1887  to a family of merchant ship Captains. While a Student Captain  in the Merchant Marine, on  March 17, 1912  he was appointed second lieutenant of  the   Naval Reserve . 
During WW I  from June  1915 to the end of  1916  he was assigned to the maritime defense of  Grado, where, at the orders of  LCDR Filippo Camperio  first, and of  CDR  Alfredo Dentice di Frasso  later, he particularly distinguished himself,  obtaining a silver medal for military valor.
He was later transferred to the newly formed MAS  flotilla, participating to various war missions. They include:

•	May 1917:  he Captured two pilots of an Austrian seaplane downed by engine failure ; for this action he was awarded his second silver medal for military valor;

•	December 1917:  Sinking of the Austrian battleship   Wien, which took place in the Trieste bay. For this action Rizzo was decorated with the  gold medal of military valor. In the same month, for missions carried out in defense of the mouth of the River  Piave, he was decorated with a third silver medal for military valor and was advanced to  Lieutenant for war merits, obtaining the transition to the Permanent Service in the Royal Italian Navy;

•	February 1918: with Gabriele d'Annunzio  and  Costanzo Ciano participated to the  "Buccari's Mock",  obtaining a bronze medal for military valor, elevated, at the end of the war, to a silver medal for military valor;

For this action he was awarded the Knight's Cross of the Military Order of Savoy.

By virtue of the R.D. 25 May  1915  nr. 753, which forbade the same person to be awarded more than three medals including silver and gold, he was not awarded the second gold medal for military valor. This restriction was repealed with the R.D. 15 June 1922  n. 975 and then, with R.D. 27 May 1923,  his appointment as a knight of the Military Order of Savoy was revoked and he was awarded the gold medal for military valor  for the Action  of Premuda.
Volunteer Fiumano in  1919, he was placed by D'Annunzio at the helm of the Quarnaro Fleet, and he operated providing food to the city,  until the beginning of  1920.  That year he left active duty with the rank of Commander. 
In  1925  he assumed the chairmanship of the  Eolie Navigation Society of  Messina, a position he held until 1948. The following year he founded  Calatimbar in Genoa, a company of shipowners, exporters and shippers, which was intended to board all goods departing from that port. Calatimbar was also attended by companies such as  Fiat, and public Agencies, such as the Port Consortium and the State Railways. On the following years he was also appointed President of the Maritime Accident and Diseases Fund of the Sea People, the Italian Maritime Safety Union, and the Anonymous Air Navigation Society..
By the Royal Decree of  25 October 1932, on 20 June  1935 he was appointed Count of Grado. The Premuda appointment was added to the Grado title with the “motu proprio” Royal Decree of 20 October 1941. In  1936, as a volunteer, he participated in the Ethiopian War; on 18 June 1936 he was appointed Division Admiral   in the Naval Reserve for outstanding merit. 
On 10 June 1940, at the outbreak of hostilities, he asked to return to active duty and he dealt with the anti-submarine warfare  in the Sicilian Channel; he was discharged from service in January 1941, assuming the post of President of Lloyd Triestino. On 20 February 1942 he was appointed President of the Adriatic Shipyards; after 8 September 1943  he ordered the sabotage of ocean liners and steamers so that they would not fall into German hands.  For this initiative he was transferred by the  Gestapo  to  Austria, first to  Klagenfurt prison and later to the obligatory stay in  Hirschegg, where he was reached by his daughter Maria Guglielmina.
He died in Rome on 27 June 1951 ,two months after an operation for lung cancer. The operation was carried out by Professor Raffaele Paolucci, his great friend, who during the Great War had been the protagonist, with  Major  Raffaele Rossetti, of the sinking in the port of  Pola  of the Austrian battleship  Viribus Unitis.

Two Italian warships have been named in his honor; The , Luigi Rizzo (F 596) in service from 1960-1980, and the FREMM multipurpose frigate, Luigi Rizzo (F 595) commissioned in 2017 and in active service.

Notes

Bibliography
 Kennedy, Paul. The Sinking of the Szent Istvan, in "The History of the First World War", BPC Publishing Ltd., Bristol, England, 1971, vol.7, no.14, pps:3072 – 3075.

See also
Giuseppe Aonzo

1951 deaths
1887 births
People from Milazzo
Italian admirals
Counts of Italy
Regia Marina personnel of World War II
Italian military personnel of World War I
Recipients of the Gold Medal of Military Valor
Recipients of the Silver Medal of Military Valor
Recipients of the War Cross for Military Valor
Recipients of the Croix de Guerre (France)
Chevaliers of the Légion d'honneur
Foreign recipients of the Distinguished Service Medal (United States)
Recipients of the Navy Distinguished Service Medal